Spizellomycetales is an order of fungi in the Chytridiomycetes. Spizellomycetalean chytrids are essentially ubiquitous zoospore-producing fungi found in soils where they decompose pollen. Recently they have also been found in dung and harsh alpine environments, greatly expanding the range of habitats where one can expect to find these fungi.

Role in the environment
Spizellomycetalean chytrids have beneficial roles in the soil for nutrient recycling and as parasites of organisms that attack plants, such as nematodes and oospores of downy mildews.  On the other hand, they also have detrimental roles as parasites of arbuscular mycorrhizae, symbiotic fungi that help plants gain essential nutrients. Culture isolation studies and molecular characterization of these fungi have demonstrated a great deal of undescribed diversity within the Spizellomycetales, even for isolates collected within the same geographic location. Thus, these understudied fungi await greater exploration.

Taxonomy
The order includes the following genera:
 Family Caulochytriaceae Subramanian 1974
 Genus Caulochytrium Voos & Olive 1968
 Family Powellomycetaceae Simmons 2011
 Genus Fimicolochytrium  Simmons & Longcore 2012 
 Genus Geranomyces D.R. Simmons 2011
 Genus Powellomyces Longcore, D.J.S. Barr & Désauln. 1995
 Genus Thoreauomyces  Simmons & Longcore 2012 
 Family Spizellomycetaceae Barr 1980
 Genus Brevicalcar Letcher & M.J. Powell 2017 
 Genus Bulbomyces Letcher & M.J. Powell 2017 
 Genus Gaertneriomyces D.J.S. Barr 1980
 Genus Gallinipes Letcher & M.J. Powell 2017 
 Genus Kochiomyces D.J.S. Barr 1980
 Genus Spizellomyces D.J.S. Barr 1980
 Genus Triparticalcar D.J.S. Barr 1980

See also
 Rozella

References

External links 
 Chytrid Fungi Online: by the University of Alabama

Chytridiomycota
Fungus orders